A Tribal Historic Preservation Officer or THPO is an officer in the United States "designated by a federally-recognized Indian tribe to direct a program approved by the National Park Service and the THPO must have assumed some or all of the functions of State Historic Preservation Officers on Tribal lands."

Each THPO prepares a Tribal Historic Preservation Plan, which is used to "advise Federal agencies on the management of Tribal historic properties..."

References

See also
State Historic Preservation Officer (SHPO)
Tribal sovereignty in the United States

Indigenous politics in North America
Native American topics